Streptomyces libani is a bacterium species from the genus of Streptomyces which was isolated from soil from Byblos in Lebanon. Streptomyces libani produces libanomycin, 4-thiouridine and oligomycin A.

See also 
 List of Streptomyces species

References

Further reading

External links
Type strain of Streptomyces libani at BacDive -  the Bacterial Diversity Metadatabase

libani
Bacteria described in 1966